The Czech Republic women's national under-19 volleyball team represents Czech Republic in international women's volleyball competitions and friendly matches under the age 19 and it is ruled by the Czech Volleyball Federation That is an affiliate of Federation of International Volleyball FIVB and also a part of European Volleyball Confederation CEV.

History

Results

Summer Youth Olympics
 Champions   Runners up   Third place   Fourth place

FIVB U19 World Championship
 Champions   Runners up   Third place   Fourth place

Europe U18 / U17 Championship
 Champions   Runners up   Third place   Fourth place

References

External links
Official website

National women's under-18 volleyball teams
Volleyball
Volleyball in the Czech Republic
Women's volleyball in the Czech Republic